Lars Kaufmann (born February 25, 1982) is a German team handball player. He is World champion from 2007 with the German national team. He participated on the German team that finished 4th at the 2008 European Men's Handball Championship.

References

External links

1982 births
Living people
German male handball players
Frisch Auf Göppingen players
HSG Wetzlar players